The Fujifilm X-E2 is a digital rangefinder-style mirrorless camera announced by Fujifilm on October 18, 2013. An updated version with minor improvements of the camera, called the Fujifilm X-E2s, was announced on January 15, 2016. Both cameras are part of the company's X-series range of cameras.

Fujifilm X-E2 

The Fujifilm X-E2 is mid-range retro-style mirrorless interchangeable lens camera. The camera has the same 16MP resolution as its predecessor but a new sensor, the X-Trans CMOS II sensor. It also gets a Wi-Fi support and a new image processor, the EXR Processor II doubling the processing speed.

X-E2 is very similar to its predecessor, the X-E1, having the same body design and control layout.

Key features 

 16MP APS-C X-Trans CMOS II sensor
 EXR Processor II
 ISO 200-6400, expandable up to 51200
 7 fps continuous shooting; 3 fps with continuous AF
 Lens Modulation Optimizer
 2.36M dot OLED electronic viewfinder
 3" 1.04M dot fixed-type LCD monitor
 Wi-Fi 4 for image transfer to smartphones or computers
 1080p 60p movie recording with built-in stereo microphone
 2.5mm stereo microphone socket
 Available in silver or black

Fujifilm X-E2s 

The Fujifilm X-E2S is a mid-range rangefinder-styled interchangeable lens mirrorless camera with a 16MP camera and X-Trans CMOS II sensor.

The X-E2s is almost identical to its predecessor, the X-E2 camera. Aside from the new firmware, also available for its predecessor, changes include an electronic shutter option, extended ISO to 51200, auto mode, motion detection for slow shutter speeds and an optimised grip along with other minor cosmetic changes. The price at release date is $300 cheaper than the X-E2's.

Key Features 

 16MP APS-C X-Trans CMOS II sensor
 EXR Processor II
 An 'Auto' button on the rear.
 Maximum ISO boost comes in at 51200
 Tweaked grip, top plate loses the 'Fujinon Lens System' engraving
 Rear four-way controller now defaults to AF point selection
 77-point autofocus system
 1080p 60p video capture
 3" 1.04M dot fixed-type LCD monitor
 2.36M dot OLED electronic viewfinder
 7 fps continuous shooting
 Wi-Fi 4

References

X-E2
Cameras introduced in 2013